"Quickie" is a song by American rapper Moneybagg Yo, released on December 8, 2022. It was produced by Skywalker OG.

Composition
The song is built on a sample of "Prelude" by Lamont Dozier. Lyrically, Moneybagg Yo reflects on a series of his encounters with women that become sexual relationships.

Critical reception
Aron A. of HotNewHipHop gave the song a "Very Hottttt" rating, writing, "Bagg's wordplay and lax delivery captures sexual tension between lovers that's similarly erotic and melancholic. 'Quickie' is an anthem that fans of Bagg have been waiting for. It shows his ability to modernize iconic samples from the past and transform them into his own, similar to 'Wockesha.'"

Music video
The music video was released alongside the single. Directed by Diesel Filmz, it finds Moneybagg Yo in a strip club, wearing neon, making it rain as women dance around him. He is also seen wearing an astronaut suit against interstellar backdrop, and having an intimate encounter with a woman in the back of a Rolls-Royce.

Charts

Release history

References

2022 singles
2022 songs
Moneybagg Yo songs
Interscope Records singles